Abdul Jamil (A.J.) Khan (12 January 1930 – 17 October 2021) was a Pakistani doctor and hospital chairman. He received his early education from Forman Christian (FC) College Lahore. Later he did his MBBS from King Edward Medical College Lahore, Pakistan. For further studies, he went to Britain and did his DCH, MRCP, FRCP. He was Pakistani chairman of a private medical university and one of Pakistan's largest private charitable hospitals.

His funeral prayer was held at Shaheena Jameel Hospital Abbottabad at 4.00 p.m. on 18 October 2021.

Achievements
A. Jamil Khan had been given the charge of many important offices in the past which include;

 Federal Minister for Population welfare, Govt. of Pakistan.
 President Pakistan Medical & Dental Council.
 Member of the Advisory Committee of Health Govt. of Pakistan.
 Director General Health, Govt. of Pakistan.
 Former Vice-president of the EMRO (Eastern Mediterranean, Region) Regional Committee of WHO.
 Former President Pakistan Pharmacy Council.
 Founding Principal Ayub Medical College, Abbottabad
 Founding Principal Frontier Medical College, Abbottabad, Pakistan.
 Member of the Hospital and Health System Monitoring Committee of the Govt. of Pakistan.
 Principal Bolan Medical College, Quetta, Pakistan.

For his meritorious services, the Government of Pakistan decorated Khan with Sitara-e-Imtiaz (Star of Distinction) by the President of Pakistan, the highest award given to a civil servant.

References

1930 births
2021 deaths
Pakistani medical doctors
People from Abbottabad
King Edward Medical University alumni